Pogost-Bykovo is a rural locality (a selo) in Seletskoye Rural Settlement, Suzdalsky District, Vladimir Oblast, Russia. The population was 12 as of 2010. There are 2 streets.

Geography 
Pogost-Bykovo is located 15 km northeast of Suzdal (the district's administrative centre) by road. Alferikha is the nearest rural locality.

References 

Rural localities in Suzdalsky District